The PLW Tag Team Championship is a professional wrestling championship in Power League Wrestling. It is the tag team championship of the PLW promotion, and one of three championship titles.

Overall, there have been 35 reigns among 28 teams. The inaugural champions were The Brutal Brigade ("Brutal" Bob Evans and Maniacal Mark), who defeated Darkside (Shawn Williams and Brian Flynn) in a tournament final on November 16, 1991, to become the first PLW Tag Team Champions. The Pillars of Power (Exterminator and Sub-Zero) hold the record for most reigns, with four. At 854 days, Elements of Suicide's (Onyx and Cinna) second reign is the longest in the title's history. Cain and Dave's (Cain the Executioner and Dave Brown) first and only reign was the shortest in the history of the title as they lost the belts back to their opponents on the same night.

Title history
Key

Reigns
As of January 1, 2016

List of combined reigns
As of April 22, 2016.

References
General

Specific

External links
PowerLeagueWrestling.com
PLW Tag Team Championship at Cagematch.net
PLW Tag Team Championship at Wrestlingdata.com

Tag team wrestling championships